The 2002–03 Missouri Tigers men's basketball team represented the University of Missouri as a member of the Big 12 Conference during the 2001–02 NCAA men's basketball season. Led by fourth-year head coach Quin Snyder, the Tigers reached the second round of the NCAA tournament, and finished with an overall record of 22–11 (9–7 Big 12).

Roster

Schedule and results

 
|-
!colspan=9 style=| Regular season

|-
!colspan=9 style=| Big 12 Conference tournament

|-
!colspan=9 style=| NCAA tournament

Rankings

Awards

References

Missouri
Missouri
Missouri Tigers men's basketball seasons